Eskil Suter (born 29 June 1967) is a former Grand Prix motorcycle road racer and current motorcycle chassis constructor from Switzerland.

Motorcycle racing career
Born in Turbenthal, Zürich, Switzerland, Suter finished in second place in the 1991 250cc International Lightweight class at the Daytona International Speedway. Suter had his best seasons in 1994 and 1996 when he finished in 13th place in the 250cc world championship. He raced in one round of the 1997 Superbike World Championship but failed to score any points. In the 1998 500cc season, he was a development rider for the MuZ team that used a Swissauto engine in a French-made ROC frame. When regular rider Doriano Romboni was injured in the second race of the season, Suter took over and scored points in three races.

Suter Racing Technology
Suter founded a company, named Suter Racing Technology (SRT) in 1996, which specialized in project engineering applied in motorcycle racing. Suter developed, in cooperation with Swissauto, the Muz 500 bike, in particular the chassis design and concept for the 1999 season, after the MuZ team decided to cease using the ROC frame.

SRT was responsible for the design and development of the Petronas FP1 900cc three-cylinder engine; the bike competed in Superbike World Championship from 2002 to 2005. The company also helped with the development of Kawasaki ZX-RR MotoGP between 2004 and 2006. In 2006 and 2007, SRT was involved with Ilmor Engineering in the chassis design of the 800cc Ilmor X3 motorcycle.

In 2010, with the introduction of the new 600cc Moto2 class, Suter Racing Technology started providing its chassis to the category. Suter won the Manufacturers' Championship in 2010 and 2011, but none of its riders claimed the title. In 2012, Suter claimed its third consecutive Manufacturers' Championship and claimed its first rider's championship when Marc Márquez became the Moto2 world champion.

SRT also built a MotoGP prototype machine for the 2012 season; the bike, powered by 1000cc BMW S1000RR engines, was tested from late 2010 and during 2011 by Marc VDS Racing Team. The bike competed in the top class with a Claiming Rule Team, Forward Racing.

SUTER MMX500

Motorcycle Grand Prix results

Points system from 1988 to 1991:

Points system in 1992:

Points system from 1993:

(key) (Races in bold indicate pole position; races in italics indicate fastest lap)

References

External links
 Eskil Suter Racing web site

1967 births
Living people
Swiss motorcycle racers
250cc World Championship riders
500cc World Championship riders
Superbike World Championship riders
Swiss motorcycle designers
People from Winterthur District
Sportspeople from the canton of Zürich